Julio Aparicio may refer to:
Julio Aparicio (born 1955), Peruvian footballer
Julio Aparicio Díaz (born 1969), Spanish bullfighter
Julio Aparicio Martínez, Spanish bullfighter and father of Julio Aparicio Díaz
Julio Aparicio Nieto, Spanish bullfighter and grandfather of Julio Aparicio Díaz